The Hangover is the third studio album from South Australian hip hop artists, Funkoars. The album was released on 29 November 2008 on the group's own label, Peepshow Entertainment.

The album peaked at number 57 on the ARIA Charts, becoming the band's first charting album.

Track listing

All songs written by Daniel Yates, Daniel Rankine, Matt Honson and Adam Baker, except where noted.
 "More of the Raw" – 3:23  
 "The Hangover" – 3:47  
 "Black Sally" (featuring Maurice Greer) (D. Yates, M. Honson, D. Rankine, A. Baker and James Aforozis) – 4:17 
 "Show Money" – 3:48 
 "Bootleg It" (featuring DJ Adfu) (D. Yates, M. Honson, D. Rankine, A. Baker and Fuad) – 4:19 
 "The Phallic Menace" – 3:17
 "What’s your Malfunction" – 4:21 
 "Double Dutch" (featuring Hilltop Hoods and Vents) (D. Yates, M. Honson, D. Rankine, A. Baker, D. Smith and M. Lambert) – 4:28 
 "Reign on the Masses" – 3:41  
 "This is How" (featuring Masta Ace) – 3:35 
 "Let you Go" – 3:23  
 "Never Coming Back" (D. Yates, D. Rankine and A. Baker) – 4:08 
 "Do it Together" (D. Yates, M. Honson, D. Rankine, A. Baker and M. Lambert) – 3:24 
 "Lock me Up" – 3:59

Charts

Release history

References 

2008 albums
Funkoars albums